Blaine Finch (born February 6, 1977) is an American politician who served in the Kansas House of Representatives in the 59th district from 2013 to 2023.

References

1977 births
21st-century American politicians
Kansas lawyers
Living people
Republican Party members of the Kansas House of Representatives